The 1923–24 United States collegiate men's ice hockey season was the 30th season of collegiate ice hockey in the United States.

Regular season

Standings

References

1923–24 NCAA Standings

External links
College Hockey Historical Archives

1923–24 United States collegiate men's ice hockey season
College